Harishchandra Madhavrao Birajdar {मराठी: हरिश्‍चंद्र माधवराव बिराजदार} (June 5, 1950 – September 14, 2011) was a wrestler and wrestling coach from India. He was a Gold Medallist in the 1970 British Commonwealth Games. He was also known as the coach of National Games winners.

Biography
Birajdar was born in Ramling Mudgad Tal in Nilanga in the Latur, district n the state 
of Maharashtra in India. He was from Lingayat community. He was coached by his father initially and then Ganpatrao Khedkar at Gangaves Talim, Kolhapur. He had defeated well-known wrestler Satpal in a 1977 bout, which brought him into limelight. Birajdar worked as coach in Gokul Vastad Talim in Pune. He was awarded the Dhyanchand Award in 2006 by the Indian Government. Earlier in 1971 he has been awarded the Shivchhatrapati award and then the Dadoji Konddev award for coaching in 1998. Even after having been honoured with so many awards and recognitions, he was a humble human being," said Ganpatrao Khedkar, under whose tutelage Birajdar wrestled from 1965 to 198

Awards and achievements
 1969: Hind Kesari
 1971: Shivchhatrapati Award
 1972: Rustum E Hind
 1998: Dadoji Konddev Award
 2006: Dhyanchand Award

See also
India at the 1970 British Commonwealth Games
Dhyan Chand Award

References

1950 births
2011 deaths
Olympic wrestlers of India
Indian wrestling coaches
People from Maharashtra
Sport wrestlers from Maharashtra
Wrestlers at the 1972 Summer Olympics
Indian male sport wrestlers
Marathi people
Recipients of the Dhyan Chand Award
Wrestlers at the 1970 British Commonwealth Games
Commonwealth Games gold medallists for India
Commonwealth Games medallists in wrestling
20th-century Indian people
Medallists at the 1970 British Commonwealth Games